The Arrondissement of Waremme is one of the four administrative arrondissements in the Walloon province of Liège, Belgium.

The Arrondissement is only an administrative one. Judicially its communes depend on the Arrondissement of Liège except for Braives, Hannut, Lincent, Saint-Georges-sur-Meuse, and Wasseiges who depend on Huy.

History
The Waremme administrative district was created in 1821 by joining the cantons of Avennes and Landen (taken from Huy) and the canton of Waremme (taken from Liège).

During the final fixing of the linguistic border in 1963, the communes of Attenhoven, Eliksem, Laar, Landen, Neerhespen, Neerlanden, Neerwinden, Overhespen, Overwinden, Rumsdorp, Wamont, Walsbets, Houtain-l'Évêque, Wange, and Wezeren were assigned to the Arrondissement of Leuven. The commune of Corswarem and part of Montenaken were assigned to the Arrondissement of Hasselt, and the commune of Otrange to the Arrondissement of Tongeren.

In 1965, the communes of Roloux and Voroux-Goreux were transferred from the Arrondissement of Liège.

In 1971, the communes of Borlez and Les Waleffes were transferred from Huy.

In 1977, the commune of Aineffe was transferred from Huy and there were exchanges of territory with the Arrondissement of Liège.

The Administrative Arrondissement of Waremme consists of the following communes and sections:

Communes 

 Berloz
 Braives
 Crisnée
 Donceel
 Faimes
 Fexhe-le-Haut-Clocher
 Geer
 Hannut
 Lincent
 Oreye
 Remicourt
 Saint-Georges-sur-Meuse
 Waremme
 Wasseiges

Sections 

 Abolens
 Acosse
 Aineffe
 Ambresin
 Avennes
 Avernas-le-Bauduin
 Avin
 Bergilers
 Berloz
 Bertrée
 Bettincourt
 Blehen
 Bleret
 Boëlhe
 Borlez
 Bovenistier
 Braives
 Celles
 Ciplet
 Corswarem
 Cras-Avernas
 Crehen
 Crisnée
 Darion
 Donceel
 Fallais
 Fexhe-le-Haut-Clocher
 Fize-le-Marsal
 Freloux
 Fumal
 Geer
 Grand-Axhe
 Grand-Hallet
 Grandville
 Haneffe
 Hannut
 Hodeige
 Hollogne-sur-Geer
 Jeneffe
 Kemexhe
 Lamine
 Lantremange
 Latinne
 Lens-Saint-Remy
 Lens-Saint-Servais
 Lens-sur-Geer
 Les Waleffes
 Ligney
 Lincent
 Limont
 Meeffe
 Merdorp
 Momalle
 Moxhe
 Noville
 Odeur
 Oleye
 Oreye
 Otrange
 Omal
 Pellaines
 Petit-Hallet
 Poucet
 Pousset
 Racour
 Remicourt
 Roloux
 Rosoux-Crenwick
 Saint-Georges-sur-Meuse
 Thisnes
 Thys
 Tourinne
 Trognée
 Viemme
 Ville-en-Hesbaye
 Villers-le-Peuplier
 Voroux-Goreux
 Wansin
 Waremme
 Wasseiges

Waremme